Joel Hoffman (born 1953 in Vancouver) is a Canadian/American composer of contemporary classical music and pianist living in New York, New York. Hoffman's music draws much of its richness and variety from such diverse sources as Eastern European folk musics, Chinese traditional music and American bebop, yet these sources seem to be seamlessly woven into a unique musical language that is pervaded by a sense of lyricism and rhythmic vitality.

Biography
Hoffman is a son of conductor Irwin Hoffman and violinist Esther Glazer. Hoffman earned his bachelor's degree from the University of Wales and a masters and doctorate from the Juilliard School. His teachers included Elliott Carter, Milton Babbitt, Vincent Persichetti, Alun Hoddinott, Arnold Whittall and Easley Blackwood.

For 36 years, he was a professor of composition at the University of Cincinnati – College-Conservatory of Music and the founder/director of the Music X festival of new music (1996–2011) which was held for the first thirteen years in Cincinnati and for the last three years at the Hindemith Music Centre in Blonay, Switzerland. He was president of Chamber Music Cincinnati (2008–2011), and has directed an annual summer course for composer/performers at the UPBEAT International Music School in Milna, Croatia since 2004 

He has been the recipient of many honors from organizations such as the American Academy of Arts and Letters, the American Academy of Arts and Letters, Columbia University, BMI, ASCAP, and the American Music Center.  Hoffman is a 2017 John Simon Guggenheim Memorial Foundation fellow.

Hoffman's music is published by Onibatan Music, his own publishing house Joel Hoffman official website, RAI Com, ECS Publishing (EC Schirmer), G. Schirmer and Vanderbilt Music Company (Lyra Music Co.).

Works 

This is a list of compositions by Joel Hoffman sorted by genre, date of composition, title, and scoring.

Recordings
Three Paths. Albany Records.

Includes:
Three Paths
Nine pieces for solo piano
...the first time and the last
Self Portrait. Albany Records.

Includes:
Sonata for Cello and Piano
unaccompanied minor
Self-Portrait with Gebirtig
Karpet

Piano Trios. Albany Records.

Includes:
Piano Trio No.1: Cubist Blues
Piano Trio No.2: Lost Traces 
Piano Trio on C-Sharp

Cubist Blues. Gasparo Records.

Includes:
Piano Trio No.1: Cubist Blues
String Quartet no. 2
Fantasia Fiorentina 
Sonata for Cello and Piano

Chinese Bamboo Flute Orchestra. China Record Corporation.

Includes Joel Hoffman: The Diz in my life

Bravo Orkester. Zalozba Kaset in Plosc.

Includes Joel Hoffman: Self-Portrait with Gebirtig

The American Experience. Milken Archive of Jewish Music.

Includes Joel Hoffman: Self-Portrait of Gebirtig

American Piano. Gasparo Records.

Includes Joel Hoffman: Fantasy Pieces

Music by Hale Smith, Sheila Silver, Joel Hoffman. CRI Recordings.

Includes Joel Hoffman: Duo for Viola and Piano

Soliloquy. Koch International.

Includes Joel Hoffman: Partenze

Premiere Chamber Works. Centaur Records.

Includes Joel Hoffman: Music for Two Oboes

Americans!. Stradivarius.

Includes Joel Hoffman: Each for Himself?

America. VDM Records.

Includes Blues and Yellow

Tum-Balalayke. EMA Records.

CD of traditional Jewish Songs; Joel Hoffman, piano and arranger

References

 http://www.joelhoffman.net/
 http://ccm.uc.edu/about/villagenews/faculty/joel-hoffman-retirement.html
 http://www.sandiegouniontribune.com/entertainment/classical-music/sdut-la-jolla-music-society-summerfest-hoffman-2015aug01-htmlstory.html
 http://www.milkenarchive.org/artists/view/joel-hoffman/
 http://www.pytheasmusic.org/hoffman_joel.html
 https://musicalics.com/en/node/98997

External links
 Joel Hoffman official website
 MusicX festival website
 University of Cincinnati-College Conservatory of Music website
 Chamber Music Cincinnati website

1953 births
Living people
Canadian composers
Canadian male composers
Canadian classical pianists
Male classical pianists
Musicians from Cincinnati
Canadian male pianists
21st-century classical pianists
21st-century American male musicians